The DDR-Liga (English: GDR League or East German League) was, prior to German reunification in 1990, the second level of football competition in the DDR (Deutsche Demokratische Republik or German Democratic Republic, commonly East Germany), being roughly equivalent to the 2. Bundesliga in West Germany.

Overview

1950-1955
The league was established with two divisions of ten teams each in 1950 as the level of play below the DDR-Oberliga, and as such was the second tier of the East German football league system. It remained the second tier in various configurations throughout its existence until it was disbanded in 1991.

The champion of each division was directly promoted to the Oberliga. While not having geographical "tags" attached to the division, Staffel 1 was originally equivalent to a Northern Division while Staffel 2 was the Southern Division. The system was not static however, clubs were often moved between groups to balance out league numbers, and sometimes also for political reasons. In the same way, clubs were also moved between cities out of a variety of reasons.

In its second season, the divisions were expanded to twelve teams each, the year after to thirteen and in 1953 to fourteen.

The year 1954 saw the creation of a third group, Staffel 3, making geographical categorizing more difficult, but essentially One was north, Two was south and Three was central.

1955-1971
The league system changed completely in 1955. East Germany followed the example of the Soviet Union and switched to a calendar year system, resulting in a shortened autumn competition for 1955 only with a single division, fourteen-team format. From the 1956 season the league continued to operate as a single division format with the top two teams gaining promotion.

After the 1960 season, the league reverted to the traditional system of playing from autumn to spring. This meant that the 1961-62 season, as a transition season, went through three rounds and each of the fourteen clubs played 39 games.

The year after, the league returned to two divisions, North and South, still with fourteen clubs each and the winners gaining promotion.

In 1963, the two divisions were expanded to sixteen clubs each.

1971-1984
After a lengthy period without changes to the system, the DDR-Ligas were revamped in 1971 when their number was increased to five with eleven teams in the C and D group and twelve teams in the other three. The year after, all five divisions had twelve clubs. The new system meant that not all league winners could be directly promoted. Instead, the five champions played a promotion round with the top two teams gaining entry to the Oberliga.

To a large extent, the five new divisions represented the pre-1950 states of East Germany, Brandenburg, Mecklenburg, Saxony-Anhalt, Saxony and Thuringia, which were all re-formed with the German reunification in 1990.

Until 1976, reserve teams of Oberliga clubs were permitted in the DDR-Liga. They were then banned from entering the second tier in order to increase the appeal of the leagues as attendance for matches involving reserve teams in Germany never were particularly high. This also resulted in the promotion round now definitely being played by the league champions. Previously, when one of the five divisions was won by a reserve team, the best placed first team from the division was entered in the promotion round.

1984-1991

The year 1984 saw the DDR-Liga revert to a two-group system, now with eighteen clubs per division and direct promotion for the champions again. Also, reserve teams were re-admitted to the league but still barred from promotion to the Oberliga.

The 1989-90 season was the last under the old East German system; in the following season the league operated under the name of NOFV-Liga, meaning Nordostdeutscher Fußballverband-Liga (English: Northeast German FA League). The majority of clubs moved away from their, mostly communist, background and adopted new or pre-DDR names. In its final season, 1990–91, the league was under the authority of the German Football Association (DFB), the (West) German Football Association. Reduced to sixteen clubs per division and without reserve teams now, the clubs played for qualification in the united German football league system from 1991. With the exception of the bottom two teams in each league, all clubs went to the new NOFV-Oberligas, the new tier 3 leagues in what were East Germany and West Berlin.

Current leagues

The NOFV-Oberliga Nord, the equivalent of the DDR-Liga Staffel A, and the NOFV-Oberliga Süd, the former DDR-Liga Staffel B, are in a geographical sense the continuation of the old leagues, covering the same regions, albeit not at the tier 2 level anymore, but as a tier 5 competition.

Leagues below the DDR-Liga

For the most part of the existence of the DDR-Liga, the leagues below it were the 15 Bezirksligas. Those were introduced in 1952. For a brief period from 1955 to 1963, the 2nd DDR-Liga formed the third tier of the East German pyramid. This league, consisting of five regional divisions, was abolished again in 1963 and the Bezirksligas became the level immediately below the DDR-Liga again. In its last season, the newly recreated states of former East Germany introduced their own regional leagues, with the exception of Mecklenburg-Western Pomerania and Berlin. Those still exist today. The Bezirksligas however have mostly either disappeared, changed their name or exist in a different format.

The fifteen Bezirksligas were:

Bezirksliga Schwerin
Bezirksliga Rostock
Bezirksliga Neubrandenburg
Bezirksliga Magdeburg
Bezirksliga Potsdam
Bezirksliga Berlin
Bezirksliga Halle
Bezirksliga Frankfurt/Oder
Bezirksliga Cottbus
Bezirksliga Gera
Bezirksliga Erfurt
Bezirksliga Suhl
Bezirksliga Dresden
Bezirksliga Leipzig
Bezirksliga Karl-Marx-Stadt

Champions of the DDR-Liga

1950–1955

1955–1971

1971–1984

1984–1991

bold denotes club gained promotion.
In 1973, the runners-up Energie Cottbus (Staffel B) and Stahl Riesa (Staffel D) were promoted as the champions of these two leagues were reserve teams and therefore ineligible for promotion.
In 1986, the runner-up Energie Cottbus was promoted instead.

Placements in the DDR-Liga 1985-1991

DDR-Liga Staffel A

 Names shown are the ones the clubs carried over most of these seasons, not necessarily the ones they carried in the last two seasons or their current ones.
♦ denotes club played in the DDR-Oberliga.
 B denotes club played in the Staffel B that season.
 In 1990, BSG Chemie Velten and SG Dynamo Fürstenwalde withdrew from the league.
 In 1989, BFC Dynamo II and Vorwärts Stralsund withdrew from the league.
 In 1988, Vorwärts Frankfurt/Oder II had to withdraw from the league because the first team was relegated.

DDR-Liga Staffel B

 Names shown are the ones the clubs carried over most of these seasons, not necessarily the ones they carried in the last two seasons or their current ones.
 ♦ denotes club played in the DDR-Oberliga.
 A denotes club played in the Staffel A that season.
 In 1990, Chemie Leipzig and Chemie Böhlen merged to form FC Sachsen Leipzig.
 In 1989, SG Dynamo Dresden II withdrew from the league.

See also
Regionalliga Nordost
NOFV-Oberliga
NOFV-Oberliga Süd
NOFV-Oberliga Mitte
NOFV-Oberliga Nord

External links
 The DDR-Oberliga at Fussballdaten.de
 Results and tables of the DDR-Liga

Sources
 Das deutsche Fussball Archiv
 DDR-Liga at RSSSF.com

2
Sports leagues established in 1950
1950 establishments in East Germany
Sports leagues disestablished in 1991
1991 disestablishments in Germany
East